This list is of the Historic Sites of Japan located within the Prefecture of Ōita.

National Historic Sites
As of 28 December 2022, forty-six Sites have been designated as being of national significance (including one *Special Historic Site).

Prefectural Historic Sites
As of 1 May 2022, one hundred and seven Sites have been designated as being of prefectural importance.

Municipal Historic Sites
As of 1 May 2022, a further three hundred and thirty-five Sites have been designated as being of municipal importance.

See also

 Cultural Properties of Japan
 Bungo Province
 Buzen Province
 Ōita Prefectural Museum of History
 List of Places of Scenic Beauty of Japan (Ōita)
 List of Cultural Properties of Japan - paintings (Ōita)

References

External links
  Cultural Properties in Ōita Prefecture

Ōita Prefecture
 Oita